In electromagnetism, the magnetic susceptibility (Latin: , "receptive"; denoted ) is a measure of how much a material will become magnetized in an applied magnetic field. It is the ratio of magnetization  (magnetic moment per unit volume) to the applied magnetizing field intensity . This allows a simple classification, into two categories, of most materials' responses to an applied magnetic field: an alignment with the magnetic field, called paramagnetism, or an alignment against the field, called diamagnetism.

Magnetic susceptibility indicates whether a material is attracted into or repelled out of a magnetic field. Paramagnetic materials align with the applied field and are attracted to regions of greater magnetic field. Diamagnetic materials are anti-aligned and are pushed away, toward regions of lower magnetic fields. On top of the applied field, the magnetization of the material adds its own magnetic field, causing the field lines to concentrate in paramagnetism, or be excluded in diamagnetism. Quantitative measures of the magnetic susceptibility also provide insights into the structure of materials, providing insight into bonding and energy levels. Furthermore, it is widely used in geology for paleomagnetic studies and structural geology.

The magnetizability of materials comes from the atomic-level magnetic properties of the particles of which they are made. Usually, this is dominated by the magnetic moments of electrons. Electrons are present in all materials, but without any external magnetic field, the magnetic moments of the electrons are usually either paired up or random so that the overall magnetism is zero (the exception to this usual case is ferromagnetism). The fundamental reasons why the magnetic moments of the electrons line up or do not are very complex and cannot be explained by classical physics. However, a useful simplification is to measure the magnetic susceptibility of a material and apply the macroscopic form of Maxwell's equations. This allows classical physics to make useful predictions while avoiding the underlying quantum mechanical details.

Definition

Volume susceptibility 
Magnetic susceptibility is a dimensionless proportionality constant that indicates the degree of magnetization of a material in response to an applied magnetic field. A related term is magnetizability, the proportion between magnetic moment and magnetic flux density. A closely related parameter is the permeability, which expresses the total magnetization of material and volume.

The volume magnetic susceptibility, represented by the symbol  (often simply , sometimes  – magnetic, to distinguish from the electric susceptibility), is defined in the International System of Units – in other systems there may be additional constants – by the following relationship:

Here
  is the magnetization of the material (the magnetic dipole moment per unit volume), with unit amperes per meter, and
  is the magnetic field strength, also with the unit amperes per meter.

 is therefore a dimensionless quantity.

Thus the volume magnetic susceptibility  and the magnetic permeability  are related by the following formula:

Sometimes an auxiliary quantity called intensity of magnetization  (also referred to as magnetic polarisation ) and with unit teslas, is defined as

Molar susceptibility and mass susceptibility 

In CGS units 
The definitions above are according to the International System of Quantities (ISQ) upon which the SI is based. However, many tables of magnetic susceptibility give the values of the corresponding quantities of the CGS system (more specifically CGS-EMU, short for electromagnetic units, or Gaussian-CGS; both are the same in this context). The quantities characterizing the permeability of free space for each system have different defining equations:

The respective CGS susceptibilities are multiplied by 4 to give the corresponding ISQ quantities (often referred to as SI quantities) with the same units:

Whereas for most electromagnetic quantities, which system of quantities it belongs to can be disambiguated by incompatibility of their units, this is not true for the susceptibility quantities.

In physics it is common to see CGS mass susceptibility with unit cm3/g or emu/g⋅Oe−1, and the CGS molar susceptibility with unit cm3/mol or emu/mol⋅Oe−1.

Paramagnetism and diamagnetism
If  is positive, a material can be paramagnetic. In this case, the magnetic field in the material is strengthened by the induced magnetization. Alternatively, if  is negative, the material is diamagnetic. In this case, the magnetic field in the material is weakened by the induced magnetization. Generally, nonmagnetic materials are said to be para- or diamagnetic because they do not possess permanent magnetization without external magnetic field. Ferromagnetic, ferrimagnetic, or antiferromagnetic materials possess permanent magnetization even without external magnetic field and do not have a well defined zero-field susceptibility.

Experimental measurement
Volume magnetic susceptibility is measured by the force change felt upon a substance when a magnetic field gradient is applied. Early measurements are made using the Gouy balance where a sample is hung between the poles of an electromagnet. The change in weight when the electromagnet is turned on is proportional to the susceptibility. Today, high-end measurement systems use a superconductive magnet. An alternative is to measure the force change on a strong compact magnet upon insertion of the sample. This system, widely used today, is called the Evans balance. For liquid samples, the susceptibility can be measured from the dependence of the NMR frequency of the sample on its shape or orientation.

Another method using NMR techniques measures the magnetic field distortion around a sample immersed in water inside an MR scanner. This method is highly accurate for diamagnetic materials with susceptibilities similar to water.

Tensor susceptibility
The magnetic susceptibility of most crystals is not a scalar quantity. Magnetic response  is dependent upon the orientation of the sample and can occur in directions other than that of the applied field . In these cases, volume susceptibility is defined as a tensor

The tensor is thus degree 2 (second order), dimension (3,3) describing the component of magnetization in the th direction from the external field applied in the th direction.

Differential susceptibility
To accommodate this, a more general definition of differential susceptibility is used

When the coercivity of the material parallel to an applied field is the smaller of the two, the differential susceptibility is a function of the applied field and self interactions, such as the magnetic anisotropy. When the material is not saturated, the effect will be nonlinear and dependent upon the domain wall configuration of the material.

Several experimental techniques allow for the measurement of the electronic properties of a material. This behaviour is known as the De Haas–Van Alphen effect and relates the period of the susceptibility with the Fermi surface of the material.

An analogue non-linear relation between magnetization and magnetic field happens for antiferromagnetic materials.

In the frequency domain
When the magnetic susceptibility is measured in response to an AC magnetic field (i.e. a magnetic field that varies sinusoidally), this is called AC susceptibility. AC susceptibility (and the closely related "AC permeability") are complex number quantities, and various phenomena, such as resonance, can be seen in AC susceptibility that cannot occur in constant-field (DC) susceptibility. In particular, when an AC field is applied perpendicular to the detection direction (called the "transverse susceptibility" regardless of the frequency), the effect has a peak at the ferromagnetic resonance frequency of the material with a given static applied field. Currently, this effect is called the microwave permeability or network ferromagnetic resonance in the literature. These results are sensitive to the domain wall configuration of the material and eddy currents.

In terms of ferromagnetic resonance, the effect of an AC-field applied along the direction of the magnetization is called parallel pumping.

Table of examples

Sources of published data
The CRC Handbook of Chemistry and Physics has one of the few published magnetic susceptibility tables. The data are listed as CGS quantities.  The molar susceptibility of several elements and compounds are listed in the CRC.

Application in the geosciences 
Magnetism is a useful parameter to describe and analyze rocks. Additionally, the anisotropy of magnetic susceptibility (AMS) within a sample determines parameters as directions of paleocurrents, maturity of paleosol, flow direction of magma injection, tectonic strain, etc. It is a non-destructive tool, which quantifies the average alignment and orientation of magnetic particles within a sample.

See also

 Curie constant
 Electric susceptibility
 Iron
 Magnetic constant
 Magnetic flux density
 Magnetism
 Magnetochemistry
 Magnetometer
 Maxwell's equations
 Paleomagnetism
 Permeability (electromagnetism)
 Quantitative susceptibility mapping
 Susceptibility weighted imaging

References

External links
Linear Response Functions  in Eva Pavarini, Erik Koch, Dieter Vollhardt, and Alexander Lichtenstein (eds.): DMFT at 25: Infinite Dimensions,  Verlag des Forschungszentrum Jülich, 2014 

Physical quantities
Magnetism
Electric and magnetic fields in matter
Scientific techniques